George Thomas Hine FRIBA (1842–25 April 1916) was an English architect.  His prolific output included new county asylums for Hertfordshire, Lincolnshire, Surrey, East Sussex and Worcestershire, as well as extensive additions to many others.

Biography
Son of Thomas Chambers Hine of Nottingham, with whom he studied from 1858, and was in partnership from 1867 to 1891.  He married in 1870 and had two children, Dr. Thomas Guy Macaulay Hine, and Muriel Hine the novelist.

Hine specialised in asylum architecture, and his paper to the RIBA in 1901 still provides a valuable review of asylum design and planning. In 1887, after winning the competition for the enormous new LCC (London County Council) asylum at Claybury, Essex, he established his practise in London. This was strengthened by his experience as Consulting Architect to the Commissioners in Lunacy, a post which he held from 1897, succeeding Charles Henry Howell. He was a frequent entrant for asylum competitions, winning his first, for Nottingham Asylum, in 1875. He competed in ten asylum competitions during the 1880s and 1890s, winning five of them, and served as assessor for four more. He designed and saw completed four major LCC asylums housing over 2,000 patients each (Claybury, Bexley, Horton and Long Grove), and his prolific output included new county asylums for Hertfordshire, Lincolnshire, Surrey, East Sussex and Worcestershire, as well as extensive additions to many others.

Architectural style
Hine's asylum designs had several distinguishing features that can be used to identify any of his many projects. All were built in red brick and had grey stonework. His later designs often feature a polychrome white/red brick pattern, especially for window mullions, although this was a relatively common architectural detail at the time and not exclusive to Hine. Hine was an early exponent of the 'echelon' design of asylums which he deployed at Claybury.

Works
Works included:
 Nottingham Borough Asylum, Mapperley, 1875–80; extended 1889–90
 The Towers Hospital, Leicester, extensions 1883–90
 4th Middlesex County Asylum, Claybury, 1887–93
 2nd Dorset County Asylum, Herrison extensions, 1890
 Sunderland Borough Asylum, Cherry Knowle, 1891–95
 3rd Middlesex County Asylum, Banstead, additions, 1893
 Isle of Wight County Asylum, Whitecroft completion, 1893
 Kesteven County Asylum, Rauceby, 1897-1902
 London County Asylum, Bexley, 1898
 Berkshire County Asylum, Fairmile extensions, 1898
 Hertfordshire County Asylum, Hill End, 1900
 Belfast Asylum for the Lunatic Poor, Purdysburn, 1900
 London County Asylum, Horton, 1901–02
 Cuckfield Isolation Hospital, Sussex 1902
 East Sussex County Asylum, Hellingly, 1901–03
 2nd Worcestershire County Asylum, Barnsley Hall, 1901–07
 Surrey County Asylum, Netherne, 1901–09
 London County Asylum, Long Grove, 1903–07
 2nd Hampshire County Asylum, Park Prewett, 1912
 Gateshead Borough Asylum, St. Mary's, 1910-14

References

External links
 Jeremy Taylor (1991). "Hospital and Asylum Architecture in England 1840–1914: Building for Health Care". London; New York: Mansell. .
 A website documenting many UK asylums, including several Hine buildings such as Hellingly and Rauceby Hospitals

1842 births
1916 deaths 
Architects from Nottingham
19th-century English architects
20th-century English architects
People involved with mental health